Mandawuy Djarrtjuntjun Yunupingu , formerly Tom Djambayang Bakamana Yunupingu; skin name Gudjuk; also known as Dr Yunupingu (17 September 1956 – 2 June 2013)  was an Australian musician and educator.

An Aboriginal Australian, in 1989 he became assistant principal of the Yirrkala Community School – which he once attended – and was principal for the following two years. He helped establish the Yolngu Action Group and introduced the Both Ways system, which recognised traditional Aboriginal teaching alongside Western methods.

From 1986, he was the frontman of the Aboriginal rock group Yothu Yindi as a singer-songwriter and guitarist. Yothu Yindi released six albums: Homeland Movement (1989), Tribal Voice (1991), Freedom (1993), Birrkuta - Wild Honey (1996), One Blood (1999), and Garma (2000). The group's top 20 ARIA Singles Chart appearances were "Treaty" (1991) and "Djäpana (Sunset Dreaming)" (1992). The band was inducted into the ARIA Hall of Fame in 2012.

Yunupingu was appointed Australian of the Year for 1992 by the National Australia Day Council. In 1993, he was one of six Indigenous Australians who jointly presented the Boyer Lectures "Voices of the Land" for the International Year of the World's Indigenous People (IYWIP). In April 1998, he was awarded an honorary doctorate by the Queensland University of Technology. He died in 2013, aged 56.

Early life
Yunupingu was born as Tom Djambayang Bakamana Yunupingu on 17 September 1956 in Yirrkala, Arnhem Land, an Aboriginal reserve in the northeastern part of the Northern Territory. He was a member of the Gumatj people, one of sixteen groups of the Yolngu people. His skin name was Gudjuk, but his name was changed to Mandawuy in 1990 when a family member with the same name died, in line with Yolngu custom. He described his names as "Mandawuy" means 'from clay'; Djarrtjuntjun means 'roots of the paperbark tree that still burn and throw off heat after a fire has died down'; Yunupingu depicts a solid rock that, having travelled from freshwater, stands in salty waters, its base deep in the earth. I am Gudjuk the fire kite".

His father was Munggurrawuy Yunupingu ( 1907 – 1978), a Gumatj clan leader and artist. His mother, Makurrngu – one of Munggurrawuy's 12 wives – was a member of the Galpu clan. His oldest sister, Gulumbu Yunupingu (1945 – 9 May 2012), was also an artist and healer. His other sisters are Nyapanyapa and Barrupu, who are also artists. His older brother, Galarrwuy Yunupingu (born 30 June 1948), is a senior elder of Arnhem Land, who was Australian of the Year in 1978, and was an Indigenous land rights campaigner. Yunupingu attended Yirrkala Community School.

Early career
In 1983, Yunupingu published "Outstation schools at Yirrkala" in Aboriginal Child at School, where he described the advantages to Indigenous people by "[determining] their own way of living, provided, they manage budgeting through Isolated Children's Allowance, staffing their schools, developing curriculum, and teacher training". In March 1987 he contributed to the book, Educational needs of the Homelands Centres of the L̲aynhapuy Region, North East Arnhem Land : report of the Balanga ̲na Project : a Schools Commission Project of national significance.

He was the first Aboriginal person from Arnhem Land to gain a university degree, earning a Bachelor of Arts degree in education from Deakin University in 1988. In 1989 he became assistant principal of the Yirrkala Community School. He helped establish the Yolngu Action Group and introduced the Both Ways system at his school, which recognised traditional Aboriginal teaching alongside Western methods. In 1990 he took over as principal of Yirrkala Community School. Also that year he authored "Language and power : the Yolngu rise to power at Yirrkala School", detailing his work with Yolngu Action Group. He remained principal until late 1991, leaving to expand his musical career.

Yothu Yindi

By 1985, with Yunupingu on vocals and guitar, he formed a Yolngu band including Witiyana Marika on manikay (traditional vocals), bilma (ironwood clapsticks) and dance, Milkayngu Mununggurr on yidaki (didgeridoo), and Gurrumul Yunupingu – his nephew – on keyboards, guitar and percussion. The following year the Yolngu group combined with a balanda (non-Indigenous) group, Swamp Jockeys, which had Andrew Belletty on drums, Stuart Kellaway on bass guitar and Cal Williams on lead guitar. The new collective, Yothu Yindi, performed Aboriginal rock which fused traditional indigenous music and dance with Western popular music. yothu yindi means "child and mother" and refers to the kinship of north-east Arnhem Land.

In the group's early years their performing was restricted to holidays as Yunupingu completed his tertiary studies and then started work as a teacher. By 1988 Yothu Yindi had toured Australia and North America supporting Midnight Oil. Late that year they recorded their debut studio album, Homeland Movement, which appeared in March the following year. Australian musicologist, Ed Nimmervoll, described it "[o]ne side comprised Midnight Oil-like politicized rock. The other side of the album concentrated on traditionally based songs like "Djäpana" (Sunset Dreaming), written by former teacher Mandawuy Yunupingu". He was credited on the album as Mandawuy Bakamana Yunupingu and provided vocals, guitar and bilma.

The band achieved national recognition for their single, "Treaty", the remixed version was released in June 1991, which reached No. 11 on the ARIA Singles Chart and stayed in the top 50 for 20 weeks. Mandawuy and Galarrwuy had wanted a song to highlight the lack of progress on a treaty between Aboriginal peoples and the federal government. The song contains words in Gumatj, Yunupingu's variety of Yolngu matha. It was written by Australian musician, Paul Kelly, with Yothu Yindi members Yunupingu, Kellaway, Williams, Gurrumul, Mununggurr and Marika. The associated album, Tribal Voice appeared in October 1991, which peaked at No. 4 on the ARIA Albums Chart. A re-recorded version of "Djäpana (Sunset Dreaming)" was issued as the second single from the album and reached No. 13.

Yunupingu's work on Tribal Voice was described by Allmusic's Jonathan Lewis, "[his] voice is suited perfectly to [traditional songs], but it is the rock tracks that are the weak links in this disc. Yunupingu is not a particularly good pop singer, and the music is sometimes insipid". Nevertheless both "Treaty" in 1992 and "Djäpana (Sunset Dreaming)" in 1993 charted on the Billboard Hot Dance Club Play singles charts, with "Treaty" peaking at No. 6, Tribal Voice peaked at No. 3 on the Billboard Top World Music Albums chart in 1992. In 1991 "Treaty", co-written by Yunupingu, won the inaugural Song of the Year Award at the APRA Music Awards presented by Australasian Performing Right Association. In May 2001 it was listed in the APRA Top 30 Australian songs of all time.

Yothu Yindi completed four more studio albums, Freedom (November 1993), Birrkuta - Wild Honey (November 1996), One Blood (June 1999) and Garma (November 2000). They toured Australia, North America, New Zealand, United Kingdom, Papua New Guinea and Hong Kong. Yunupingu strove to achieve a better understanding of Aboriginal culture by balanda and was a prominent advocate of reconciliation between all Australians.

Yunupingu and the band established the Yothu Yindi Foundation in 1990 and since 1999 promoted the annual Garma Festival. From May 2007 the foundation has supported the Dilthan Yolngunha (Healing Place), which uses traditional healing practices and mainstream medicine.

Recognition and awards
 On 26 January 1993, Yunupingu was named Australian of the Year for 1992 by the National Australia Day Council.
 In 1993, Yunupingu's friend, filmmaker Stephen Maxwell Johnson (Yolngu Boy, High Ground), made a feature-length documentary about him, called Tribal Voice.
 In April 1998 he was awarded an honorary doctorate by the Queensland University of Technology, "in recognition of his significant contribution to the education of Aboriginal children, and to greater understanding between Aboriginal and non-Aboriginal Australians".
 On 1 January 2001, Yunupingu awarded the Centenary Medal for service to Australian society through music.
 Yunupingu was inducted into the NT Hall of Fame at the NT Indigenous Music Awards 2004. Yothu Yindi were inducted into the ARIA Hall of Fame in December 2012, with Peter Garrett (frontman of Midnight Oil) and Paul Kelly introducing the group.
 In the 2014 Australia Day Honours, Yunupingu was posthumously invested as a Companion of the Order of Australia (AC), for eminent service to the performing arts as a musician and songwriter, to the advancement of education and social justice for Indigenous people, and as an advocate for cultural exchange and understanding.

Death and legacy
Yunupingu died on 2 June 2013, aged 56 following a long battle with kidney disease. After his death, the Prime Minister of Australia at the time, Julia Gillard, said: "We have today lost a great Australian voice in the efforts towards reconciliation."

In June 2014, the annual Dr Yunupingu Award for Human Rights was created as one of three awards at the newly-established National Indigenous Human Rights Awards in Sydney, New South Wales. His wife Yalmay delivered one of the keynote speeches at the inaugural awards ceremony on 24 June.

On 17 September 2020, Google celebrated Yunupingu's 64th birthday with a Google Doodle.

Personal life and family
Yunupingu was married to a fellow teacher, Yalmay Marika of the Rirritjingu clan, also referred to as Yalmay Yunupingu. He is survived by his five daughters and five grandsons.

One of his grandsons, Rrawun Maymuru, is lead singer of East Journey. In May 2013, the National Indigenous Music Awards announced that Yothu Yindi were to be honoured at their awards ceremony in August, in which Maymuru was to be backed by original band members. Yunupingu declared "My heart is full of joy. I am so happy to see that in my lifetime Indigenous music has come such a long way. And to have these talented artists come together to honour the groundbreaking work of Yothu Yindi makes me proud beyond words. Yow Manymak."

His nephew Geoffrey Gurrumul Yunupingu also played in Yothu Yindi. Gurrumul later formed the Saltwater Band and also had a solo career. Other members of the extended Yunupingu family have also performed in Yothu Yindi: Galarrwuy (guitars and vocals); Mangatjay (dance); Yomunu; Gapanbulu (yidaki); Gavin Makuma (yidaki, bilma, vocals); Malngay Kevin (yidaki, bilma, dancer, vocals); and Narripapa Nicky (yidaki, dancer). His nephew, Gavin Makuma Yunupingu, was jailed in 2002 over the death of Betsy Yunupingu, his cousin. Another nephew, Nicky Yunupingu, died by suicide in July 2008.

Health
Yunupingu was diagnosed with diabetes and high blood pressure, which in turn contributed to advanced kidney failure, for which he received haemodialysis three times a week in Darwin. His condition was announced in 2007 following his attendance in January at a rehabilitation clinic after years of beer drinking – between one and four cartons (i.e. two to eight gallons, or 9 to 36 litres) daily, according to his psychiatrist. By December 2008 he was resigned to the fact that he may die without having seen the longed-for settlement between white and black Australia:

By October 2009 he was on a kidney transplant waiting list. He also undertook traditional healing practices. His sister Gulumbu was one of a group of senior Yolngu women who had helped set up Dilthan Yolngunha – a healing place – with the support of the Yothu Yindi Foundation. Yunupingu was one of its first patients.

Bibliography

References
General
 
 

Specific

External links
 Yothu Yindi official website
 
 Message From Mandawuy Documentary produced by Australian Story
 "Portrait of Mandawuy Yunupingu" [picture] by Jacqueline Mitelman, 1997; "Mandawuy Yunupingu of Yothu Yindi performing at Homebake, Sydney, January 2000 [picture] by Martin Philbey, 2000; stored at National Library of Australia, accessed 4 June 2013.

1956 births
2013 deaths
APRA Award winners
Australian guitarists
Australian rock guitarists
Australian rock singers
Australian singer-songwriters
Australian of the Year Award winners
Companions of the Order of Australia
Deakin University alumni
Deaths from kidney failure
Indigenous Australian musicians
Musicians from the Northern Territory
Recipients of the Centenary Medal
Yolngu people
20th-century Australian musicians
20th-century guitarists
20th-century Australian male musicians
Australian headmasters
Australian male guitarists
Australian male singer-songwriters
Australian republicans